Lisa Young may refer to:
 Lisa Young (golfer) (born 1960), Canadian golfer later known as Lisa Walters
 Lisa Young (gymnast) (born 1966), British gymnast
 Lisa Young (musician), Australian jazz vocalist
 Lisa Marie Young (1981–2002), missing Canadian